Outreach is an evangelical magazine based in Colorado Springs, Colorado. It focuses on activities of growing churches and is non-denominational. It is a periodical from the organization Outreach, Inc., founded in 1996 by Scott Evans and provides community outreach products.

Each October, Outreach lists the 100 largest and the 100 fastest growing churches in America.

History
The magazine was started in January 2002.

Outreach, Inc. announced that it would be moving its church communications, publishing and media company to Colorado Springs in June 2012, and would be hiring for about 70 positions.

References

External links
  

Religious magazines published in the United States
Christian magazines
Magazines established in 2002
Magazines published in Colorado
Mass media in Colorado Springs, Colorado